Urgamal (Plant/grow) is a sum (district) of Zavkhan Province in western Mongolia. In 2005, its population was 1,822.

References 

Districts of Zavkhan Province